The Nintendo DSi system software is a set of updatable firmware versions, and a software frontend on the Nintendo DSi (including its XL variant) video game console. Updates, which are downloaded via the system's Internet connection, allow Nintendo to add and remove features and software. All updates also include all changes from previous updates.

Technology

User interface
The user interface of the Nintendo DSi has been redesigned from the Nintendo DS and Nintendo DS Lite. The DSi's user interface is a single row of icons which can be navigated by sliding the stylus across them. When the DSi is booted for the first time, the system snaps a shot of the user's face which is then displayed on the home menu's top screen. From the home menu, the user can take a picture at any time by pressing the shoulder buttons. While the system is on, the power button acts as a soft reset button that returns the user to the home menu. 

The Nintendo DSi provides some built-in applications. Initially, users are able to access five programs from the main menu: DSi Camera, DSi Sound, DSi Shop, PictoChat, and Download Play. The DSi's menu is akin to the Channel interface of the Nintendo Wii in that new programs can be downloaded and added to the interface. The DSi Camera application allows for taking images and applying various filters. The DSi Sound application is thematically similar to DSi Camera, serving as a sound recorder and editor (along with a low bitrate AAC music player). Features include themed equalizers and modulators that modify a user's voice to sound similar to a robot or parakeet (Toy Story 3 is the only DSi enhanced game to use the DSi's audio modulator engine). The DSi Shop would serve as the DS version of the Wii Shop Channel.

Multimedia features
Unlike Nintendo's previous handheld consoles such as the Nintendo DS and Nintendo DS Lite, the Nintendo DSi has built in music playback support. The DSi Music program is split into two modes: voice recording and music playback. Both offer plenty of entertainment value because of the tools and gimmicks Nintendo has included. The recording mode lets users record at most 18 clips of maximum 10 seconds length. Once they have recorded a clip, they can play around with it in various ways. For example, users can make the clip play backwards or forwards, isolate small sections using A-B repeat, and modify the speed and tone by dragging a pointer around on a 2D graph. They can also apply 12 effects to the clip, which can be used to  transform the sound. The music playback mode also has many play options. Once a song has been loaded up, users can change the speed and tone just like with the recording mode. They can also overlay the recordings that has been made in the recording mode to songs at any point. In addition, Nintendo has provided a set of sound effects which can be selected quickly by using the stylus, then inserted freely using shoulder buttons.

Unlike the built-in DSi Camera application, which would not read any files that were not generated by the DSi itself, the DSi Music application does not have this restriction when it comes to files and directory structure. When files are stored in a multi-level directory structure into the root directory of the SD card, the DSi parsed through them instantly and displayed all the internal directories for quick access. During playback, users have access to features such as forwarding, rewinding, and volume controls. Nintendo presumably envisioned DSi Music as being a substitute for a real music player. However, there is an important drawback of the DS Music application, that is, it does not support the popular MP3 format. Instead, the player only supports the AAC format with .mp4, .m4a, or .3GP filename extensions. Furthermore, compared with Sony's PlayStation Portable it is more difficult to interface the DSi with a PC, as there is no USB port on the system. In order to transfer music and podcasts over, users will need to remove the SD Card and plug it directly into their PC.

Internet features
One of the major updates the Nintendo DSi brings to the Nintendo DS line is full network connectivity. Unlike the original Nintendo DS and Nintendo DS Lite which only featured minimal network connectivity, download content and firmware updates are at the core of the DSi experience, similar to the Wii and Sony's PlayStation Portable consoles. For example, when users first power up the system and click on the DSi Shop icon from the main menu, they are immediately prompted to run a firmware update. The Nintendo DSi supports WEP, WPA (AES/TKIP), and WPA2 (AES/TKIP) wireless encryption; only software with built-in support can use the latter two encryption types, as they were not supported by the DS and DS Lite.

With the DSi Shop application users can purchase various DSiWare titles. The cute music and blocky interface are somewhat similar to the counterpart on the Wii. Users can permanently login with their Club Nintendo account to track purchase rewards, and the main shopping interface also lets users add DSi Points and read the DSi shop manual. As with the firmware updates, the DSi shopping experience is quite similar to that of the Wii, although a big problem with the DSi Shopping is the slow speed.

Furthermore, like the previous Nintendo DS and DS Lite, the Nintendo DSi includes a web browser, which is a version of the Opera browser. It has support for the HTML5 canvas object and CSS opacity. However, there are limitations for these features and web surfing on either of these platforms as a whole is not a good experience. In addition to slow download speeds, the browser has difficulty rendering pages. For example, many pages would not load completely, and it is not compatible with movie files, music files or Adobe Flash on multimedia content sites like YouTube. Nintendo Life rated the browser 7/10 points, calling it "well worth having" despite its limitations, and improved from the Nintendo DS incarnation.

DSiWare and backward compatibility

On the Nintendo DSi, there are a collection of games and applications specifically designed for the Nintendo DSi handheld game console and available for download via the DSi Shop, known as DSiWare. Since these games and applications are specifically targeted for the Nintendo DSi, they are not compatible with the original Nintendo DS or Nintendo DS Lite consoles. The Nintendo DSi is Nintendo's first region-locked handheld; it prevents using certain software released for another region, unlike original Nintendo DS models. But as a member of the Nintendo DS line, the Nintendo DSi is backward compatible with most original Nintendo DS games, and cartridge software compatible with previous models including original DS games, Internet browsing, and photo sharing are not region-locked. Later, its successor, the Nintendo 3DS consoles also adopted this approach, and as a result all Nintendo DSi and 3DS-specific games are locked to a certain region, while original DS games are still region-free. In addition to DSiWare, which are DSi-exclusive (although later they can also run on a 3DS), there are also "DSi-enhanced" games containing DSi-exclusive features, but can still be played with earlier Nintendo DS models. While most original DS games can run on the DSi, the DSi is not backward compatible with Game Boy Advance (GBA) games or original DS games that require a GBA slot, since the DSi itself lacks of such a slot, unlike the DS and DS Lite. Because of this absence, the DSi is also not backward compatible with accessories requiring the GBA slot, such as the Nintendo DS Rumble Pak. Homebrew flash cards designed for previous DS models are incompatible with the DSi, but new cards capable of running DS software (or even DSiWare) on a DSi were available. While users cannot transfer purchased DSiWare on Nintendo DSi consoles between units, most DSiWare can be transferred to a Nintendo 3DS, although not saved data. Like the Nintendo DSi, the Nintendo 3DS is backward compatible with most Nintendo DS and Nintendo DSi software.

History of updates
This is a list of major system updates of the Nintendo DSi.

References

Nintendo DSi
Game console operating systems
Proprietary operating systems